N50 may refer to:

Roads 
 N50 road (Ireland) 
 N50 road (Netherlands)
 N-50 National Highway, in Pakistan
 Nebraska Highway 50, in the United States

Other uses 
 N50 (Long Island bus)
 Acer N50, a PDA
 Gaagudju language
 , a mine control vessel of the Royal Norwegian Navy commissioned in 1995
 , a minesweeper of the Royal Norwegian Navy acquired in 1962
 Li Calzi Airport, in Cumberland County, New Jersey, United States
 N50 statistic, used in genome assembly
 Nikon N50, a camera
 Nissan Xterra (N50), a Japanese SUV
 Toyota Hilux (N50), a Japanese pickup truck